The 1947 Maryland Terrapins men's soccer team represented University of Maryland, College Park during the 1947 ISFA season. It was the second season the program fielded a varsity men's soccer team. It was also the team's final year as an independent, before they moved to the Southern Conference.

The 1947 season was the first season the program earned a national end-of-season recognition, finishing atop the final NSCAA rankings for the 1947 season. Despite this, the ISFA awarded the Springfield College Pride the national title. 

The team played seven matches during the season, accumulating a 6-0-1 record.

Roster 

Source

Schedule 

|-
!colspan=6 style=""| Regular season
|-

|-

Honors

References 

Maryland Terrapins men's soccer seasons
Maryland
1947 in sports in Maryland